The Convict from Istanbul (German: Der Sträfling aus Stambul) is a 1929 German silent drama film directed by Gustav Ucicky and starring Heinrich George, Betty Amann and Paul Hörbiger. It was shot at the Babelsberg Studios in Berlin. The film's art direction is by Heinz Fenchel and Jacek Rotmil.

Cast
 Heinrich George as Thomas Zezi 
 Betty Amann as Hilde Wollwarth 
 Paul Hörbiger as Vlastos 
 Willi Forst as Manopulos 
 Trude Hesterberg as Jola Zezi 
 Lotte Lorring as Dolly 
 Frida Richard as Zimmerwirtin 
 Paul Rehkopf as Winkeladvokat 
 Erich Moeller as Polizist 
 Leo Peukert  
 Arthur Wellin

References

Bibliography
 Prawer, S.S. Between Two Worlds: The Jewish Presence in German and Austrian Film, 1910-1933. Berghahn Books, 2005.

External links

1929 films
1929 drama films
Films of the Weimar Republic
German silent feature films
German drama films
Films directed by Gustav Ucicky
UFA GmbH films
Films with screenplays by Franz Schulz
German black-and-white films
Silent drama films
Films shot at Babelsberg Studios
1920s German films
1920s German-language films